Odites semisepta is a moth in the family Depressariidae. It was described by Edward Meyrick in 1930. It is found in Cameroon.

References

Moths described in 1930
Odites
Taxa named by Edward Meyrick